Peter Asher,  (born 22 June 1944) is an English guitarist, singer, manager and record producer. He came to prominence in the 1960s as a member of the pop music vocal duo Peter and Gordon before going on to a successful career as a manager and record producer, helping to foster the recording careers of James Taylor and Linda Ronstadt among others. As of 2018, he tours alongside Jeremy Clyde of Chad and Jeremy in a new duo entitled Peter and Jeremy, where they perform hits from both of their respective catalogues. In 2019, Asher published a book The Beatles from A to Zed about his personal reminiscences about the band.

Early life
Asher was born at the Central Middlesex Hospital to Richard and Margaret Asher, née Eliot. His father was a consultant in blood and mental diseases at the Central Middlesex Hospital, as well as being a broadcaster and the author of notable medical articles. Asher's mother was a professor at the Guildhall School of Music and Drama. One of her pupils there was George Martin. Asher is the brother of Clare Asher, a radio actress and school inspector, and Jane Asher.

When he was eight years old, he began working as a child actor, and appeared in the film The Planter's Wife, and the stage play Isn't Life Wonderful. At the age of nine, Asher played the central juvenile part in the 1953 film version of Isn't Life Wonderful!, along stars Cecil Parker and Donald Wolfitt. In 1955 he played the youngest brother, "Johnny", in Escapade, based on Roger MacDougall's play. The film starred John Mills and Alastair Sim. He also appeared in the ITV series The Adventures of Robin Hood.

In 1956, Asher appeared as a 12-year-old in The Talking Head, one of the short films in the series of Colonel March of Scotland Yard, starring Boris Karloff.

While attending the independent Westminster School as a day boy, he first met fellow pupil Gordon Waller (1945–2009), and they began playing and singing together as a duo in cafes. In 1962, they began working formally as Peter and Gordon. Their first (and biggest) hit was the 1964 Lennon/McCartney song "A World Without Love". Asher's sister Jane was, in the mid-1960s, the girlfriend of Paul McCartney. Through this connection, Asher and Waller were often given unrecorded Lennon/McCartney songs to perform.

Asher later read philosophy at King's College London. 

In 1965, he was best man when singer Marianne Faithfull married John Dunbar in Cambridge.

After Peter and Gordon disbanded in 1968, Asher took charge of the A&R department at the Beatles' Apple Records label, where he signed a then-unknown James Taylor and agreed to produce the singer-songwriter's debut solo album. The album was not a success, but Asher was so convinced that Taylor held great potential that he resigned his post at Apple to move to the United States and work as Taylor's manager. Asher produced Paul Jones' rendition of the Bee Gees' "And the Sun Will Shine" which was released as a single (only in the UK). He also produced a number of Taylor's recordings from 1970 to 1985, including Sweet Baby James, Mud Slide Slim and the Blue Horizon, JT and Flag.

1970s and beyond
In the early 1970s, Asher also managed the country rock band, Country, which recorded for Atlantic Records through its subsidiary Clean Records, featuring Michael Fondiler and Tom Snow, who has since become a songwriter. For a time, Asher also managed James Taylor's sister Kate Taylor. When she decided to leave the business, she recommended him to Linda Ronstadt at which point Asher became Ronstadt's manager. Asher achieved his greatest success producing a long string of multi-platinum albums for James Taylor, including Sweet Baby James, JT and Flag, and for Linda Ronstadt, including Heart Like a Wheel; Simple Dreams; Living in the USA; What's New; Canciones De Mi Padre; and Cry Like a Rainstorm, Howl Like the Wind.

The Roxy Theatre in West Hollywood was opened on 23 September 1973 by Elmer Valentine and Lou Adler along with original partners David Geffen, Elliot Roberts and Peter Asher.

Asher also played a role in shaping the Californian rock sound prominent during the 1970s, producing records for Ronstadt, J. D. Souther, Andrew Gold and Bonnie Raitt. In 1976, Asher and Waller reformed for the annual New York "Beatlefest" and played a few other dates. In the 1980s, Asher also worked on hit albums for artists as diverse as Cher and 10,000 Maniacs.

In February 1995, Asher was named Senior Vice-President, Sony Music Entertainment. At the beginning of 2002, Asher left Sony and returned full-time to the management of artists' careers as co-President of Sanctuary Artist Management. In January 2005 he was named President, the position he held until September 2006, when he resigned. In 2007 Asher joined forces with his friend Simon Renshaw (who manages the Dixie Chicks) at the company Simon founded, Strategic Artist Management. Strategic has grown into a dominant force in the entertainment industry, now managing artists in many fields of endeavour beyond just music – one of Asher's clients is Pamela Anderson. Asher also reunited with James Taylor as the producer of the Live at the Troubadour reunion album recorded in 2007, with Carole King and Taylor's original band.

During 2005 and 2006, Peter and Gordon reformed for occasional concerts. However, Waller died in 2009 and in its obituary, The Times observed that "Waller was thought more handsome than the slightly nerdish looking Asher".

Asher had been quoted as saying that actor Mike Myers has said he had patterned his Austin Powers character after Asher's appearance, although Elizabeth Hurley, who co-starred in Austin Powers, said the original model was broadcaster Simon Dee.

In 2011, Asher was the executive producer of the Listen to Me: Buddy Holly compilation album and also music supervisor, producer, and co-host of the Buddy Holly: Listen to Me; The Ultimate Buddy Party PBS Pledge Special. Performed and filmed in front of a live audience the Buddy Holly tribute concert aired as PBS Pledge Special in December 2011 and May and June 2012. The Special received the highest 2012 Silver Telly Award in the Category of TV Programs, Segments, or Promotional Pieces.

Asher was appointed Commander of the Order of the British Empire (CBE) in the 2015 New Year Honours for services to the British music industry.

In May 2017, Asher debuted a weekly, hour-long series on the brand-new Sirius XM Radio station for The Beatles called "From Me To You". He also announced with commentary the Top 100 Beatles countdown "All Together Now" on The Beatles Channel that first aired on Sirius XM Radio on the Labor Day Weekend in 2017, and is frequently replayed.

Since 2016, Peter Asher has been playing shows, including one at the Edmonton Folk Music Festival, as part of a duo with Albert Lee that showcases songs from both their careers.  He currently resides in Venice, California.

In 2018, Asher began performing with Jeremy Clyde of Chad & Jeremy fame.

Personal life
Asher had a short-lived relationship with singer Millie Small, also known as Millie, who sang "My Boy Lollipop".

Asher's daughter is musician, director, and producer Victoria Asher.

Awards and recognition

Grammy Awards
1977 – Producer of The Year, Non-Classical (Simple Dreams, JT)
1989 – Producer of the Year, Non-Classical (Cry Like a Rainstorm, Howl Like the Wind)
2002 – Best Spoken Comedy Album (Live 2002 (Robin Williams))

CBE
2015 - appointed Commander of the British Empire

Discography

As performer
All releases by Peter and Gordon unless noted.

As producer

As executive producer

References

External links
 Official Website
 Once Life Matters: A New Beginning – author Marty Angelo. Reference: Apple Records 1969 recording contract offer to Raven, pp. 62–65.

 An Off-road Retreat for a 60's Pop Star
Interview with Peter Asher - NAMM Oral History Library (2016)

1944 births
Living people
People educated at Westminster School, London
People educated at The Hall School, Hampstead
Alumni of King's College London
Apple Records
English record producers
English male guitarists
English male singers
People from Willesden
English male film actors
English male television actors
Grammy Award winners
English male child actors
Mensans
Commanders of the Order of the British Empire
Traditional pop music singers